Acleris phalera is a species of moth of the family Tortricidae. It is found in the Russian Far East (Amur, Ussuri) and Japan.

The wingspan is about 14 mm.

The larvae feed on Fragaria limunae.

References

Moths described in 1964
phalera
Moths of Asia
Moths of Japan